Richard Lowell Hummel (born February 25, 1946) is an American author and sports columnist best known for his work for the St. Louis Post-Dispatch. Hummel was inducted into the National Baseball Hall of Fame in Cooperstown, New York in 2007 when he was honored with the J. G. Taylor Spink Award for baseball writing. Known throughout baseball by his nickname "The Commish", he is a former president of the Baseball Writers' Association of America.

Early life
Richard Lowell Hummel was born on February, 25, 1946. in Quincy, Illinois. He graduated from Quincy Senior High School in 1964. At first Hummel remained in his hometown for higher education, attending Quincy University before transferring to the University of Missouri to attend their renowned School of Journalism. Rick Hummel expressed an interest in sports journalism and broadcasting at an early age, having auditioned for a job at Quincy station WGEM (AM) when he was twelve years old. Hummel did not get the announcing job, but later in high school he worked as a spotter for former MLB player and coach Elvin Tappe and his twin brother Melvin as they broadcast Quincy High School games. It was Melvin Tappe who also encouraged Hummel to pursue a career as a sports writer. While attending the University of Missouri Hummel returned home during two summers to work for the Quincy Herald-Whig. At Mizzou, he worked on the Sports Information department's statistics crew for football games alongside another future sports notable, John Walsh, now executive vice president and executive editor of ESPN.

Professional career
Following graduation from the University of Missouri in 1968, Rick Hummel served three years in the U.S. Army. While stationed in Colorado he also worked as a part-time employee for two years on the Colorado Springs Free Press-Sun After his discharge from the Army in 1971, Hummel was hired by fellow Mizzou alum Bob Broeg to work for the St. Louis Post-Dispatch. Broeg, who himself would earn the Spink award and be inducted into Cooperstown in 1979, at first assigned Hummel to cover secondary and St. Louis regional teams for the newspaper. Hummel "made his bones" as a beat writer for the St. Louis Stars professional soccer team, the American Basketball Association's Spirits of St. Louis, and St. Louis University hockey, among others. An avid amateur athlete in his younger years, Hummel earned his nickname "The Commish" or "The Commissioner" for his exhaustive knowledge of the rules involved in the softball, football, and bowling leagues he and Post-Dispatch teammates participated in.

The first of Rick Hummel's big breaks at the Post-Dispatch came in 1973 when he covered around eight St. Louis Cardinals home games for the newspaper, his first being a 1-0 rain-shortened victory over the Montreal Expos. Another milestone came in 1978 when long-time Cardinals beat writer Neal Russo was unable to make a trip to Cincinnati, Ohio. Hummel was sent in his place and ended up covering a historic game as Hall of Famer Tom Seaver pitched his only career no-hitter in a 4–0 victory for the Reds. Hummel continued to work as the game-day beat reporter until 2002 when he transitioned to the primary role of weekly baseball columnist, while still covering the occasional Cardinals game. In activities away from the Post-Dispatch, in 1994 his peers elected Hummel President of the Baseball Writers' Association of America. He has also served on the Baseball Hall of Fame Overview Committee, reviewing the careers of potential inductees by the Veterans Committee. In addition to his print media career Rick Hummel is often called upon for his baseball expertise and opinions by St. Louis radio and television stations as well as being a frequent on-camera contributor to Fox Sports Midwest's St. Louis Cardinals pre-game and post-game broadcasts. His commentary has also been featured on various ESPN shows and documentaries.

Personal
Rick Hummel's ex-wife Connie Karr, the mother of his daughter Lauren, was one of five people murdered during the Kirkwood City Council shooting in February 2008. Hummel has a total of three children, one son and two daughters.

Books
 2012 -- One Last Strike: Fifty Years in Baseball, Ten and a Half Games Back, and One Final Championship Season, written with Tony La Russa 
 2007 -- The Commish and the Cardinals: The Most Memorable Games, as Covered by Hall of Famer Rick Hummel for the St. Louis Post-Dispatch  
 1989 -- Tom Seaver's Scouting Notebook written with Tom Seaver and Bob Nightengale

Awards and honors
 2007 - J.G. Taylor Spink Award and induction into the Baseball Hall of Fame in Cooperstown, New York.
 2008 - Inducted into the Missouri Sports Hall of Fame.
 3-time "Missouri Sportswriter of the Year"  as selected by the National Sportscasters and Sportswriters Association.
 Member, Quincy High School Blue Devils Hall of Fame.

References

Living people
People from Quincy, Illinois
Writers from Missouri
Writers from Illinois
Quincy University alumni
Missouri School of Journalism alumni
BBWAA Career Excellence Award recipients
St. Louis Post-Dispatch people
United States Army soldiers
1946 births
Journalists from Illinois
Sportswriters from Illinois